Der Ermittler is a German television series.

See also
List of German television series

External links
 

2001 German television series debuts
2005 German television series endings
German crime television series
2000s German police procedural television series
Television shows set in Hamburg
German-language television shows
ZDF original programming